Straight Life is a 1979 jazz album by American saxophonist Art Pepper playing with Tommy Flanagan, Red Mitchell, Billy Higgins and Kenneth Nash.

Some versions have the bonus track "Long Ago (and Far Away)".

Title Track
Pepper's composition "Straight Life" is a contrafact of "After You've Gone", and it was also recorded for Pepper's 1957 album Art Pepper Meets the Rhythm Section. Pepper re-used the title for his 1979 autobiography Straight Life. Pepper was not the only jazz musician to use the title. Trumpeter Freddie Hubbard and organist Jimmy Smith both released albums and compositions unrelated to Pepper's with the title "Straight Life".

Track listing
"Surf Ride" (Art Pepper) – 6:57
"Nature Boy" (eden ahbez) – 9:55
"Straight Life" (Art Pepper) – 4:09
"September Song" (Kurt Weill, Maxwell Anderson) – 11:00
"Make A List" (Art Pepper) – 9:46
(Recorded on 21 September 1979.)

Personnel
Art Pepper – alto saxophone
Tommy Flanagan – piano
Red Mitchell – bass
Billy Higgins – drums
Kenneth Nash – cowbell, reco-reco (on "Make A List" only)

Sources
Richard Cook & Brian Morton. The Penguin Guide to Jazz on CD. Penguin,  4th edition, 1998.

References

1979 albums
Art Pepper albums
Galaxy Records albums